T.V. Ibrahim is an Indian politician belonging to Indian Union Muslim League. He is the current MLA of Kondotty, Malappuram.

Early life 
T.V. Ibrahim was born on May 1, 1965, in Pookkottur, to Shri T.V. Mohammedhaji and Smt. Ithikkutty K. He is married to Smt. Sareena and has one daughter and two sons. He received his master's degree in political science from Madurai Kamaraj University in 2001, and M.Phil from Annamalai University in 2008. He also acquired B.Ed and entered into the field of teaching.

Political career 
T.V Ibrahim started his political career as the State President and General Secretary of Muslim Students Federation. He then went on to become the State Secretary of Youth League, President of Malappuram Block Panchayat (1995-2000) and member of Malappuram District Panchayat (2000–05). Later on he became the Secretary of IUML in Malappuram District.

Currently, he is involved as the Secretary of Athanikkal M.I.C Orphanage, President of Athanikkal Public Library and Vice President of P.K.M.I.C. Orphanage, Pookkottur.

He is an Executive Committee Member of State and National Committee of Indian Union Muslim League and has been newly elected to Kerala Legislative Assembly.

Election Performance

Kerala Legislative Assembly Election 2021 
There were 2,05,261 registered voters in the constituency for the 2021 Kerala Niyamasabha Election.

Kerala Legislative Assembly Election 2016
There were 1,88,358 registered voters in Kondotty Constituency for the 2016 Kerala Niyamasabha Election.

References

1965 births
Living people
Place of birth missing (living people)
Kerala MLAs 2016–2021
Indian Union Muslim League politicians
Kerala MLAs 2021–2026